Khalifa Ababacar Diop (born 15 January 2002) is a Senegalese professional basketball player for CB Gran Canaria of the Liga ACB. He also plays for the Senegal national team. Diop was drafted 39th overall by the Cleveland Cavaliers in the 2022 NBA draft.

Early career 
Diop trained with the junior teams of CB Gran Canaria and CB TerrAlfas. In 2018, he was named the MVP of the national junior club championship. He debuted with Gran Canaria B in the Liga EBA, the Spanish fourth level league, at age 15. On 3 November 2011, Diop recorded 25 points and a league record 28 rebounds in a Liga EBA game against Novum Energy Lyceum.

Professional career

Gran Canaria (2017–present) 
On 28 March 2019, Diop made his senior debut for Gran Canaria, recording three points and four rebounds in a 90–55 loss to Maccabi Tel Aviv in the EuroLeague. On 24 November 2019, he made his Liga ACB debut, playing three minutes in a loss to Real Madrid. Diop was named EuroCup Rising Star and made the ACB All-Young Players Team for the 2021–22 season.

After declaring for the 2022 NBA draft, Diop was drafted 39th overall by the Cleveland Cavaliers. Cavaliers GM Koby Altman announced a few days later that Diop would not join the Cavaliers roster in the 2022-23 NBA season, and would stay in the Spanish League. Diop later signed a contract extension with Gran Canaria.

National team career
Diop represented Senegal at the 2019 FIBA Under-19 World Cup in Heraklion. He averaged 13.1 points, seven rebounds and 1.4 assists per game. Diop helped Senegal win the silver medal at the 2020 FIBA U18 African Championship in Egypt, where he averaged 12.6 points, 11.8 rebounds, 3.4 assists and 3.4 steals per game. At the 2021 FIBA Under-19 Basketball World Cup in Latvia, he averaged 14 points, 9.4 rebounds and 2.1 assists per game.

In February 2022, Diop was selected for the Senegal senior national team for the qualifiers of the 2023 FIBA Basketball World Cup.

References

External links
Khalifa Diop International Stats at Basketball-Reference.com

Living people
2002 births
CB Gran Canaria players
Centers (basketball)
Cleveland Cavaliers draft picks
Liga ACB players
Senegalese expatriate basketball people in Spain
Senegalese men's basketball players